Arrambam is the soundtrack album, composed by Yuvan Shankar Raja, to the 2013 film of the same name, directed by Vishnuvardhan starring Ajith Kumar, Arya, Nayantara and Taapsee Pannu. The album consists of six tracks. Pa. Vijay penned all lyrics for the songs. It was released on 19 September 2013. The album opened at number one on iTunes India within a few minutes after its release at midnight, which, according to Sify, "no Tamil album has done before".

Production
Yuvan Shankar Raja was signed on to compose the film's soundtrack and score, becoming his sixth project starring Ajith Kumar. In November 2012, Yuvan Shankar Raja composed a new song for the film. On 23 April 2013 the composer tweeted that he had completed three songs, and that one of which was a "mass intro song" rendered by Shankar Mahadevan. Vijay Yesudas stated that he had sung a "celebration song" in the film.

In August 2013 it was reported that Vairamuthu's younger son Kabilan Vairamuthu was enlisted to pen lyrics for a song in the film, his first time working with Yuvan. His lyrics were scrapped later and all five songs were written by Pa. Vijay only.

The music rights were sold to Sony Music India.

Release
Yuvan Shankar Raja had handed over the master copy of the audio to the film's producer on 21 August and it was reported that the soundtrack would release on 9 September for Vinayagar Chaturthi. On 14 September 2013, Sony Music India announced that the album would be released directly to stores on 19 September, while also revealing the track list.

On the same day, Theatrical trailer was released and went viral in YouTube. The trailer received massive response all over India as "Most Stylish one ever" leaving the high expectations in the kollywood. This movie was scheduled to release on 31 October 2013 two days before Diwali.

Reception
Behindwoods.com rated the album 3.75 out of 5 and stated, "Pulsating rhythms, entertaining hooks and hair-raising lyrical moments make Arrambam a commercial heavyweight". Indiaglitz.com rated the album 3.5/5 and stated "Yuvan strikes a Homerun".

The album has also been a commercial success and described as "one of the biggest hits of the year". Upon its release on 19 September, at midnight, the album immediately reached number one spot on the iTunes India store. Sify wrote that "no Tamil album has done (this feat) before". Ashok Parwani, General Manager at Sony Music, stated that it had done "very well from a sales perspective". The CDs were sold out within two days and the second batch of hit the stores on 23 September.

Track listing
Arrambam (Original Motion Picture Soundtrack)

Personnel

Instruments
 Live Drums & Percussion: V. Kumar
 Additional keyboards: Sivaranjan
 String instruments: R. A. Amalraj
 Flute: Napoleon
 Shenoy: Baalesh

Production
 Program Manager: V. Karthik
 Program Co-ordination: A. S. Subbiah
 Recorded at: Prasad Studios & Unique Studios, Chennai
 Recorded by: M. Kumaraguruparan, Bharani & Prabhakar
 Mixed at Pinkstone Studios, Chennai
 Mixed and mastered by M. Kumaraguruparan

References

Yuvan Shankar Raja soundtracks
2013 soundtrack albums
Sony Music India soundtracks
Tamil film soundtracks